Franz Heinrich Hieronymus Valentin Graf von Lützow or Hrabě František Lützow or Count Francis Lützow (21 March 1849 Hamburg – 13 January 1916 Territet, Vaud, Switzerland) was a Bohemian (Czech) author, historian, critic and revivalist.

Biography
Count Franz von Lützow was the son of Franz Joseph Johann Nepomuk Gottfried von Lützow (1814-1897) and Henriette Seymour (1822-1909), granddaughter of Marquess of Hertford. He was educated at Vienna and Innsbruck and followed a diplomatic career. He was active in Bohemian politics and became a member of the Austrian parliament and Chamberlain to the Emperor Franz Joseph from 1881.  He married Anna Gustava von  Bornemann (6 January 1853 Paris – 18 April 1932 London) on 18 Jan 1881 in London. 

A tireless champion of Bohemian independence from the Austro-Hungarian Empire, he was a member of the Royal Society of Sciences in Bohemia, and of the Bohemian Academy. 

He was Ilchester lecturer at Oxford (1904), and in 1912 lectured at American universities.

Works
Perhaps his greatest accomplishments are his various books regarding the history of Bohemia, Prague, Slavic poetry, Historiography and Literature.  His works were intentionally written in the English language and were thus more easily accessible to Western decision-makers who would eventually agree to the formation of an independent Czechoslovakia after the end of World War I.  The first president of Czechoslovakia, Tomáš Garrigue Masaryk wrote a touching introduction to Lützow's 1939 edition of 'Bohemia, An Historical Sketch' and expressed gratitude for Lützow's various contributions to Czechoslovakia's independence.

 History of Bohemian Literature, Heinemann. London (1899); (2nd ed. April 1907)
 The Story of Prague J. M. Dent & Co.  London 1902; 2nd ed. 1907.
 Lectures on the Historians of Bohemia 1905 London: Henry Frowde.
 Life and Times of Master John Hus (1909) E.P. Dutton & Co.  London 1909; (2nd ed. 1929)
 Bohemia An Historical Sketch  J. M. Dent & Sons Ltd. London 1896; 2nd ed. 1910; 3rd ed. 1939.
 The Hussite Wars (1914) London: J. M. Dent & Sons New York

Notes

References

External links 

 
 
 
  Czech Information Center Žampach - of Dr. František Lützow

1849 births
1916 deaths
20th-century Austrian historians
Austrian diplomats
Counts of Austria
Historians of the Czech Republic